Lunkaran (12 January 1470 – 30 March 1526) was the third Rao of Bikaner, ruling from 1505 to 1526. He spent much of his two-decade long reign consolidating and expanding the territories of his relatively new kingdom.

Background
Lunkaran was born on 12 January 1470, a younger son of Rao Bika, the eponymous founder of the kingdom of Bikaner. His mother, Bhatiyani Rani Rang Kanwar, was the daughter of Rao Shekha, the Bhati ruler of Pugal.

Reign
In January 1505, Lunkaran ascended the throne at the age of 35 following the premature death of his elder brother Nara. His first military engagement was the suppression of nobles who, after having lost lands under Bika, had revolted during the reign of Nara. Later, in 1509, he marched against Man Singh Chauhan of Dardrewa, defeating him after a siege of seven months and absorbing his lands. In 1512, he invaded Fatehpur, which was being ruled by the Kayam Khani king Daulat Khan. Taking advantage of a feud between Khan and another ruler, Lunkaran swept into the region and annexed 120 villages. The following year, he defeated the Khanzada ruler of Nagaur in battle and also conquered extensive territory from Chayal Rajputs near Hisar and Sirsa.

In early 1526, he became involved in a dispute with Rawal Jait Singh of Jaisalmer. Allegedly, the contention arose when Jait Singh insulted Lunkaran's clan, the Rathores, publicly in court. When chided by a noble visiting from Bikaner, the Rawal mocked them further by stating that he would bestow to the Brahmins of his kingdom as much land as the Rathors could ride over. When the noble reported the exchanged to Lunkaran, he took up the challenge and, with his riders, invaded the Rawal's territory. His forces penetrated as far as the city of Jaisalmer itself and laid siege to it, capturing Jait Singh in the process. He only lifted the assault and released the captive king after the latter pledged to give his daughter in marriage to one of Lunkaran's sons.

Death
In March that same year, Lunkaran and three of his sons rode into battle against the Nawab of Narnaul. However, while fighting in the village of Dhosi, several of his supporters withdrew from the battle. As a result of this, the Bikaner forces were overwhelmed, with Lunkaran, his sons, and his purohit Devidas being killed. He was succeeded on the throne by his son Jait Singh.

Issue

Sons
 Ratan Singh – ancestor of the chiefs of Mahajan
 Jait Singh, Rao of Bikaner
 Pratap Singh (killed in Narnaul)
 Barsi (killed in Narnaul)
 Tejsi 
 Netasi 
 Kishan Singh 
 Ram Singh 
 Suraj Mal 
 Kushal Singh 
 Roop Singh 
 Karamsi

Daughters
 Bala Bai: married Prithviraj Singh I, Raja of Amber
 Unnamed daughter: married Nahar Khan, Kayam Khani ruler of  Fatehpur (son of Daulat Khan)

Ancestry

References

Rajput rulers
1470 births
1526 deaths
Maharajas of Bikaner
People from Bikaner